The Best of Coal Chamber is a compilation album by the American nu metal band Coal Chamber, released through Roadrunner Records on August 10, 2004 on CD. The album mixes several tracks from their three studio albums, Coal Chamber, Chamber Music, Dark Days, recorded from 1994 to 2002. It received 3.5 stars from AllMusic.

Background 
The first five tracks of the album are all featured on Coal Chamber's self-titled debut album. The album was recorded  at NRG Recording, North Hollywood, CA in 1996. Produced by Jay Gordon through Roadrunner Records, the album has been certified Gold by the RIAA, with an excess of 500,000 copies in the United States. A special edition version of the album was released in 2005, featuring 6 extra tracks. The live footage on the special edition was shot at the Whisky a Go Go in LA, CA, 1996, which was included in Kerrang! 100 greatest gigs of all time.

On September 7, 1999, Roadrunner Records released Chamber Music. There are 18 tracks on the album, 4 of which are featured on The Best of Coal Chamber. Dark Days is the third studio album by Coal Chamber. It was recorded in 2001 and released on May 7, 2002. "Fiend", a track featured on this compilation, is the album's only single. Its music video found airplay on Uranium, which also featured an interview with the band.

Reception 
The compilation did not receive many reviews by critics. AllMusic gave the album 3.5 out 5 stars, but did not publicize any further reviews.

Track listing

Personnel

Coal Chamber
Dez Fafara - vocals
Miguel Rascón - guitar
Nadja Peulen - bass
Rayna Foss - bass
Mikey Cox - drums

Production
Josh Abraham - producer
Aimee Echo - backing vocals
Jay Baumgardner - mixing
David Bianco and Amir Derakh - additional mixing
Tom Burleigh - compilation producer
Caroline Greyshock - photography, cover photo
Bryan Reesman - liner notes

References 

2004 greatest hits albums
Coal Chamber albums
Roadrunner Records compilation albums